Orthostoma is a genus of beetles in the family Cerambycidae, containing the following species:

 Orthostoma abdominale (Gyllenhal in Schoenherr, 1817)
 Orthostoma chryseis (Bates, 1870)
 Orthostoma vittata (Aurivillius, 1910)

References

Compsocerini